The women's 76 kg competition at the 2018 World Weightlifting Championships was held on 7 November 2018.

Schedule

Medalists

Records

Results

References

External links
Results 
Results Group A 
Results Group B

Women's 76 kg
2018 in women's weightlifting